José María Martínez López (born 22 September 1942 in Larache, Morocco), sometimes known as Chito, is a Spanish professional football player and manager.

Career
José Martínez played for Real Zaragoza, Jerez Industrial CF and other several Spanish clubs.

He has coached several Spanish sides. Since 25 April 2007 until 15 May 2008 he coached the Gambia national football team.

References

External links
 

1942 births
Living people
Spanish footballers
Association football midfielders
Real Zaragoza players
Spanish football managers
Expatriate football managers in the Gambia
Gambia national football team managers
People from Larache
Spanish expatriate sportspeople in the Gambia
Spanish expatriate football managers